Michel Galarneau (born March 1, 1961) is a Canadian-born French former ice hockey centre. He played 78 games in the National Hockey League with the Hartford Whalers between 1980 and 1983, while mainly playing in the minor leagues. He moved to Europe in 1984, spending one season in the Dutch Eredivisie, and then moved to the French domestic league in 1985, where he played until retiring in 2000. Internationally Galarneau represented the French national team at the 1995 World Championships.

Biography
Galarneau was born in Montreal, Quebec. As a youth, he played in the 1973 and 1974 Quebec International Pee-Wee Hockey Tournaments with a minor ice hockey team from Rosemont, Montreal. He played junior hockey in the Quebec Major Junior Hockey League for the Hull Olympiques where in his second season in 1979-80, he scored 39 goals and 64 assists for 103 points. He was drafted in the second round as a result of his highly productive performance, selected 29th overall by the Hartford Whalers in the 1980 NHL Entry Draft. He was unable to repeat his performances as a pro however, receiving limited ice-time during his spell with the Whalers, splitting his ice-time with the American Hockey League's Binghamton Whalers. In his three seasons with the Whalers, Galarneau played 78 regular season games, scoring 7 goals and 10 assists for 17 points.

Galarneau spent one season in the Central Hockey League for the Montana Magic as well as brief spells in the AHL for the Binghamton Whalers and the Fredericton Express before moving to the Netherlands for one season with Eindhoven Kemphanen. In 1985, Galaneau moved to France's Ligue Magnus and signed for HC Amiens. After six seasons, he moved to HC Briançon for one season before moving to Division 1 team Anglet for one season. In 1993, he moved to Brest where he won two French Championships in 1996 and 1997. He remained with the team until his retirement in 2000.

Galarneau spent a total of 16 seasons in France. Though a Canadian, he obtained French citizenship during his lengthy spell in the country and represented his adopted country in the 1995 World Championships.

Career statistics

Regular season and playoffs

International

References

External links

1961 births
Living people
Anglet Hormadi Élite players
Binghamton Whalers players
Brest Albatros Hockey players
Canadian emigrants to France
Canadian expatriate ice hockey players in France
Canadian ice hockey centres
Diables Rouges de Briançon players
Kemphanen Eindhoven players
Fredericton Express players
French ice hockey players
French Quebecers
Gothiques d'Amiens players
Hartford Whalers draft picks
Hartford Whalers players
Hull Olympiques players
Montana Magic players
Ice hockey people from Montreal